Sun Tin Wai is one of the 41 constituencies in the Sha Tin District in Hong Kong.

The constituency returns one district councillor to the Sha Tin District Council, with an election every four years.

Sun Tin Wai constituency is loosely based on part of the Lee Uk Village, San Tin Village, Golden Lion Garden and Sun Tin Wai Estate with an estimated population of 17,028.

Councillors represented

Election results

2010s

2000s

1990s

Notes

References

Sha Tin
Constituencies of Hong Kong
Constituencies of Sha Tin District Council
1994 establishments in Hong Kong
Constituencies established in 1994